Brigadier General Lê Nguyên Vỹ (22 August 1933, Sơn Tây, Tonkin, French Indochina—30 April 1975, Saigon, Republic of Vietnam) was an officer in the Army of the Republic of Vietnam.

Education

In 1951, he graduated from the officers candidate course in the Regional Military School, Military Region II at Phu Bai near Huế.

Military service

He was the commander of 5th Infantry Division at Lai Khe. He was born in Sơn Tây province, North Vietnam.  As a deputy Commander of the 5th Infantry, He fought fiercely during the siege of Battle of An Lộc and later was promoted to the CO of the division.

On April 30, 1975, after receiving the order to surrender after the communist North Vietnamese and Việt Cộng captured Saigon, he committed suicide at 11:00 AM, at the division headquarters in Lai Khe.

External links
An Exceptional Regimental Commander

1933 births
1975 deaths
People from Hanoi
Army of the Republic of Vietnam generals
Vietnamese military personnel
South Vietnamese military personnel of the Vietnam War
Deaths by firearm in Vietnam